Sharon Robinson (born in 1958 in San Francisco USA) is an American singer, keyboardist, songwriter, and record producer. She is best known as a frequent writing collaborator with Leonard Cohen, although she has written songs for a number of other artists as well, including The Pointer Sisters, Aaron Neville, Brenda Russell, Diana Ross, Don Henley, Michael Bolton, Randy Crawford, Patti LaBelle, Roberta Flack, The Temptations, Bettye LaVette and others.

Biography
She toured as back-up singer for Cohen in 1979 and 1980, and then again during 2008–2013. They collaborated on writing the songs "Everybody Knows" and "Waiting for the Miracle", released in 1988 and 1992 respectively. In 2001 she co-wrote, produced, arranged and performed the backing tracks (as well as appearing alongside Cohen on the cover) for his album Ten New Songs. Robinson also contributed to three tracks on Cohen's 2004 album Dear Heather, and duetted with Cohen on "The Letters".

She was awarded a Grammy in 1985 for the song "New Attitude" (from the Beverly Hills Cop soundtrack), recorded by Patti LaBelle.

In 2004, Robinson gave a full-length interview discussing her life, career and work with Leonard Cohen.

In 2005, Robinson wrote the song "The High Road" specifically for Bettye LaVette for her album I've Got My Own Hell to Raise, which was picked as #59 at Amazon's best of 2005 Editor's picks. Robinson's recent work also includes the songs written for Chris Botti.

In 2008, Robinson released her debut solo album Everybody Knows, which includes three songs she co-wrote with Cohen: "Alexandra Leaving", "Everybody Knows", and "Summertime", their first collaboration, originally recorded by Diana Ross for her 1987 album Red Hot Rhythm & Blues. The set also includes "The High Road", and six new tracks written by Robinson.

On October 27, 2008, Vibrant Records released Everybody Knows in the United Kingdom and Europe, replacing the original artwork from Leonard Cohen with a photo of Robinson.  In February 2009, Vibrant Records closed due to the bankruptcy of its distributor Pinnacle. In April 2009, UK label Freeworld Records re-released Everybody Knows in Europe with the original Leonard Cohen-drawn cover art. Robinson self-released the album in the U.S.

In 2008 Robinson joined The Leonard Cohen World Tour which lasted until December 2013. In August 2013 she was profiled in a cover story in the Financial Times. A book of her photographs was released in December 2014 along with exhibits in New York and Los Angeles, and performances in those cities and Toronto.

Sharon Robinson appeared on Cohen's 2012 album Old Ideas singing, arranging choirs and playing synth bass on four tracks.

Robinson performed songs from both her albums and also songs she co-wrote with Cohen on a tour in March and April 2015, coinciding with the release of her second solo album, entitled Caffeine, singing in Belgium, Netherlands, Germany, France, Ireland, Scotland and England. Caffeine included 10 new tracks written and produced by Sharon Robinson herself, with one song, "Lucky", co-written with Cohen in the 1980s but not recorded.

In 2015 Robinson released a four-track EP titled Sharon Robinson EP 1, covering songs by Tom Waits, Otis Redding, Bruce Hornsby, and Eric Clapton. After her second 2015 tour was postponed, she toured in Europe again in August and September 2016. In August 2016, she was the guest of honor at the 10th Leonard Cohen Event, held in Amsterdam.

Discography

 Leonard Cohen
 I'm Your Man (1988, wrote and composed a song, Everybody Knows)
 The Future (1992, co-writer on a song, Waiting For The Miracle)
 Cohen Live: Leonard Cohen In Concert (1994, co-writer on one song, Everybody Knows)
 Field Commander Cohen: Tour of 1979 (2000, backing vocals)
 Ten New Songs (2001) (Writing, composition, keyboards, synths, vocals, arrangements)
 Dear Heather (2004; backing vocals, arrangements)
 Live in London (2009, backing vocals)
 Songs from the Road (2010, backing vocals)
 Old Ideas ( 2012, backing vocals, synth bass)
 Live in Dublin (2014, backing vocals) Also on DVD.
 Can't Forget: A Souvenir of the Grand Tour (2015, backing vocals)
 Thanks for the Dance ( 2019, percussion and vocals on a song) - With Daniel Lanois.

Solo albums
 Everybody Knows (2008) - Leonard Cohen, artwork & songwriting for 3 songs.
 Caffeine (2015) - Leonard Cohen songwriting on 1 song 
 EP 1 (songs by Waits, Redding, Hornsby, Clapton) (2015)
 We Were Dreamers - 2021
 Bibliography 
 2014 : On Tour with Leonard Cohen - Photographs by Sharon Robinson'' - PowerHouse books

References

 On Tour with Leonard Cohen - Photographs by Sharon Robinson : https://www.sharonrobinsonmusic.com/biography

External links

 Sharon Robinson's official website
 Leonard Cohen and Sharon Robinson: a special relationship
 Sharon Robinson European Tour 2015

American women singer-songwriters
Leonard Cohen
Record producers from California
Living people
Grammy Award winners
1958 births
Singers from San Francisco
Songwriters from San Francisco
20th-century American women singers
American women record producers
20th-century American singers
Singer-songwriters from California